Nathaniel Wyeth may refer to:

Nathaniel Wyeth (inventor) (1911–1990), inventor of the recyclable PET plastic bottle
Nathaniel Jarvis Wyeth (1802–1856), developer of the US ice industry